Club Defensores de Cambaceres is an Argentine football club from the city of Ensenada, Buenos Aires Province. The team currently plays in Primera C, the regionalised fourth division of the Argentine football league system.

The club was founded in 1921 with the name "Club Social y Deportivo Defensores de Cambaceres" (Defenders of Cambaceres Social and Sports Club), and the kit color (red) was chosen as an homage to Independiente, one of the most successful teams of Argentina. Cambaceres was not affiliated to the Argentine Football Association until 1957.

Honours
Primera C (2): 1990–91, 1998–99
Primera D (2): 1959, 1976
Liga Amateur Platense  (11): 1927, 1929, 1931, 1934, 1935, 1939, 1941, 1944, 1946, 1950, 1956

Team 2020
February 15 2020

Notes

References

External links

 
 

Association football clubs established in 1921
Football clubs in Buenos Aires Province
1921 establishments in Argentina